The Image of Irelande, with a Discoverie of Woodkarne is a 1581 book by John Derricke.

The book is dedicated to Philip Sidney. It praises the deputyship of Philip's father Henry Sidney and English victories over the Irish. The work opens with a poetic history of Ireland and its conflicts with the English, presenting reasons for English rule. This proceeds to a set of twelve woodcut illustrations interspersed with verse narration, describing Henry Sidney's victories of Irish rebels and denigrating Irish culture. The book ends with the surrender of Turlough Luineach Ó Neill, king of Tyrone, in 1578. Critics, such as James A. Knapp, have deemed the illustrations to be of far greater interest than the unremarkable verse.

There is only one complete version extant, at the Edinburgh University Library. A copy was produced and edited by the university librarian in 1883.

Footnotes

References
 Andrew Hadfield, "Derricke, John (fl. 1578–1581)", Oxford Dictionary of National Biography, online edn, Oxford University Press, Sept 2004, accessed 27 July 2010
 James A. Knapp, "'That moste barbarous Nacion': John Derricke's Image of Ireland and the 'delight of the well disposed reader'", findarticles.com, 2000
 Anthony M. McCormack and Terry Clavin, "Derricke, John", Dictionary of Irish Biography, (Eds.) James Mcguire and James Quinn, Cambridge University Press, 2009.

External links

 Woodcuts from The Image of Irelande, Edinburgh University Library
 The Image of Irelande, 1883 reprint with introduction and notes, downloadable in multiple formats from Archive.org
 Richard Marsh's explanation of plate 3

History books about Ireland
History books about England
1581 in England
English non-fiction books
1581 books